CT Financial Services Inc., operating as Canada Trust, was a financial services holding company headquartered in Toronto, Ontario, which operated in Canada through its trust company subsidiaries, including Canada Trustco Mortgage Company and The Canada Trust Company.

The company's operations were acquired by the Toronto-Dominion Bank in 2000, and merged into Toronto-Dominion's existing retail banking operations, forming the current TD Canada Trust division.

History

Canada Trust began in 1894 as the General Trust Corporation of Canada. In 1899 it changed its name to the Canada Trust Company. In 1901, the London, Ontario company Huron and Erie Savings and Loan Society, which had been founded in 1864, purchased Canada Trust and began operating it as a subsidiary. The Huron and Erie Savings and Loan Society changed its name in 1915 to the Huron and Erie Mortgage Corporation. Eventually the parent and subsidiary began branding itself Huron and Erie-Canada Trust, and in 1962 changed to Canada Trust-Huron and Erie to reflect the company's national reach. In 1976 Huron and Erie changed its name to Canada Trustco Mortgage Company, which continued to operate Canada Trust as a subsidiary.

Canada Trust was a trust company that offered the same services as a bank. It was one of Canada's largest non-bank financial institutions, with $38 billion in deposits and $176 billion in assets. It had 11,000 employees and 3.5 million customers and operated a network of 413 branches across Canada; and almost 1,000 automated banking machines. Its banking machines were, at one point in the late 1980s to early 1990s, called "Johnnycash" machines. They were even promoted with lifesize cutouts of Johnny Cash asking the question, "Why walk the line?", a reference to one of his hit songs.

In the United States, CT Financial operated through First Federal Savings and Loan Association. First Federal was founded in 1896, and operated through 82 branches throughout New York State. CT Financial also operated other divisions including Truscan Realty Limited (d/b/a Canada Trust Realty), CT Insurance Limited and Canada Trust Bank N.V.

During the 1980s and 1990s, CT Financial was controlled by Imasco, a conglomerate which at that time also owned Imperial Tobacco Canada and Shoppers Drug Mart. Imasco was publicly traded, although it was controlled by British American Tobacco. During the late 1990s, some synergy between the companies manifested in the form of Canada Trust ATMs appearing in or adjacent to Shoppers Drug Mart locations.

In 1999, BAT moved to take Imasco private, but had no interest in the company's non-tobacco assets, which put Canada Trust in play. CIBC had long indicated its interest in Canada Trust, but ultimately BAT accepted an $8 billion offer from the Toronto-Dominion Bank. Following the completion of this deal on February 1, 2000, Canada Trust's retail banking operations were integrated into TD's similar operations, now collectively known as TD Canada Trust.

TD continues to operate The Canada Trust Company as a subsidiary entity (having been amalgamated with the aforementioned Canada Trustco Mortgage Company, as well as the bank's existing subsidiary TD Trust Company). That company now primarily provides traditional trust company services, and also services Canada Trust accounts opened prior to the merger with TD (other existing TD Canada Trust-branded accounts are actually issued by TD Bank itself).

References

Toronto-Dominion Bank
Trust companies of Canada
Defunct financial services companies of Canada
Mortgage lenders of Canada
Banks established in 1864
Banks disestablished in 2000
1864 establishments in Canada
2000 disestablishments in Ontario